Paolo Bugas (born 22 October 1994) is a Filipino footballer who is currently a free agent. He has played for Philippines national team.

College career
Bugas was born at Nabunturan, Compostela Valley and a player for the FEU Tamaraws football team of the Far Eastern University. He was named Most Valuable Player at UAAP Season 76 in 2014.

Club career

Loyola
On 8 March 2014, Bugas made his debut for the Sparks as a substitute, replacing Simon Greatwich at the 62nd minute against Global.

Global
On 18 July 2015, Bugas made his debut for Global in a 2-2 draw against Manila Jeepney. He came in as a substitute replacing OJ Clariño on the 67th minute.

International career
He made his first International cap for the Philippines in a 3-nil home victory against Cambodia

Bugas came in as a substitute in the 66th minute replacing Daisuke Sato in a friendly match against the Maldives on September 3, 2015.

References

External links
 

1994 births
Living people
Filipino footballers
Philippines international footballers
Global Makati F.C. players
F.C. Meralco Manila players
Association football midfielders
Far Eastern University alumni
People from Davao de Oro
University Athletic Association of the Philippines footballers